Sardar Hussain is a Pakistani politician who had been a Member of the Provincial Assembly of Khyber Pakhtunkhwa, from April 2014 to May 2018.

Early life and education
He was born on 5 May 1967 in Buni, Chitral District.

He has a degree in Master of Arts.

Political career

He ran for the seat of the Provincial Assembly of Khyber Pakhtunkhwa as a candidate of Pakistan Peoples Party (PPP) from Constituency PK-90 Chitral-II in 2013 Pakistani general election but was unsuccessful. He received 10,841 votes and lost the seat to Ghulam Muhammad, a candidate of All Pakistan Muslim League (APML).

He was elected to the Provincial Assembly of Khyber Pakhtunkhwa as a candidate of PPP from Constituency PK-90 Chitral-II in by-polls held in April 2014. He received 1,778 votes and defeated Ghulam Muhammad, a candidate of APML.

References

Living people
Khyber Pakhtunkhwa MPAs 2013–2018
1957 births
Pakistan People's Party politicians